The Black Swan is a 1932 British historical adventure novel by the Anglo-Italian writer Rafael Sabatini. Like the author's earlier Captain Blood, it focuses on piracy in the seventeenth century Caribbean.

Film adaptation
In 1942 the novel served as the basis of the Hollywood film The Black Swan starring Tyrone Power and Maureen O'Hara.

References

Bibliography
 Goble, Alan. The Complete Index to Literary Sources in Film. Walter de Gruyter, 1999.

1932 British novels
British historical novels
British adventure novels
Novels set in the 17th century
Novels by Rafael Sabatini
British novels adapted into films
Hutchinson (publisher) books
Houghton Mifflin books
McClelland & Stewart books